The alphabet song or ABCs is any of various songs used to teach children an alphabet. Alphabet songs typically recite the names of all letters of the alphabet of a given language in order.

The ABC (Verse 1) 
"The ABC Song", otherwise referred to as "Now I Know My ABCs" or simply "The ABC", "ABC Song", "ABCs"  or "ABC" , is one of the best-known English/French alphabet songs, and perhaps the one most frequently referred to as "The Alphabet Song", or "The Alphabet", "Alphabet Song" or "Alphabet" for short, especially in the United States and Canada.

The song was first copyrighted in 1835 by the Boston-based music publisher Charles Bradlee, and given the title "The A.B.C., a German air with variations for the flute with an easy accompaniment for the piano forte". The musical arrangement was attributed to Louis Le Maire (sometimes Lemaire), an 18th-century composer. This was "Entered according to act of Congress, in the year 1835, by C. Bradlee, in the clerk's office of the District Court of Massachusetts", according to the Newberry Library, which also says, "The theme is that used by Mozart for his piano variations, Ah, vous dirai-je, maman." This tune is the same as the tune for "Twinkle, Twinkle, Little Star" and similar to that of "Baa, Baa, Black Sheep".

Lyrics: (each line represents two measures, or eight beats)
A, B, C, D, E, F, G...
H, I, J, K, L, M, N, O, P... ("L, M, N, O" spoken twice as quickly as rest of rhyme)
Q, R, S.../ T, U, V... (pause between S and T, though in some variants, "and" is inserted)
W... X.../ Y and(/&) Z. (pause between X and Y, and W and X last for two beats)
Now I know my ABCs.
Next time, won't you sing with me?
Due to the speed at which 'L, M, N, O, P' is spoken it is a common misconception among children still learning the alphabet to believe that it is in fact its own letter called 'elemenopee' (among other variations). Some have proposed teaching slower versions of the song to avoid this issue.

Backwards alphabet 
This is a version that goes Z to A instead of A to Z.
z-y-x and(/&) w
v-u-t, s-r-q
p-o-n-m-l-k-j
i-h-g-f-e-d-c-b-a
Now you know your ZYXs
I bet that's not what you expected!
The e-d-c-b part is as fast as the l-m-n-o part in the normal alphabet song.

Pronunciation of "Z" 
In the dialects spoken in most English-speaking countries, including the United Kingdom, the letter name for Z is pronounced /zɛd/ (Zed); although in American English, the dialect in mind by the composer, the letter is more commonly pronounced /ziː/ (Zee). In dialects which use the Zed pronunciation, the absent Zee-rhyme is generally not missed, although whilst singing the song, some children may accommodate for Zee which they would otherwise not use on a regular basis. Variants of the song exist to accommodate the Zed pronunciation. One variation shortens the second line and lengthens the last, to form a near rhyme between N and Zed:

a-b-c-d-e-f-g
h-i-j-k-l-m-n
o-p-q-r-s-t-u
v-w-x-y-z(ed)

French Canadian version 

A French-language version of the song is also taught in Canada, with generally no alterations to the melody except in the final line that requires adjustment to accommodate the two-syllable pronunciation of the French y.

Phonics songs 
Because the English language has more than 40 sounds and only 26 letters, children and beginning readers also need to learn the different sounds (or phonemes) associated with each letter. Many songs have been written to teach phonemic awareness and they are usually referred to as alphabet songs.

Acrostic songs 
There are also songs that go through the alphabet, making some of the letters stand for something in the process. An example, "'A' You're Adorable" (also known as "The Alphabet Love Song"), was recorded in 1948, by Buddy Kaye, Fred Wise, Sidney Lippman, and later Perry Como.

A newer example of this is from the musical Matilda. "School Song" is an acrostic that spells out the alphabet phonetically.

Backwards song (Verse 2) 
The group Wee Sing released an alphabet song with the letters in reverse order, called "ZYXs".

The Canadian children's TV series The Big Comfy Couch used a version of the song in the first episode of Season 4, "Backwards".

Comedian Soupy Sales released a song in 1966 called "Backwards Alphabet" which contained the reverse alphabet in lyrical style. The original version of the song was performed by actress Judi Rolin with the Smothers Brothers in the 1966 teleplay adaptation of Alice Through the Looking Glass.

See also

Traditional alphabet songs in other languages 
"A Haka Mana" recites the syllabary of the Māori language to the tune of Stupid Cupid
"Alef-Bet" by Debbie Friedman, a song commonly used in American Hebrew school classrooms to teach the letters of the Hebrew alphabet
"Iroha", a recital of the Japanese syllabary
"Shiva Sutra", Sanskrit
"Thousand Character Classic", Chinese and Korean Hanja
"Ganada", Korean Hangul
"Zengő ABC" by Ferenc Móra, Hungarian
"Алфавит мы уже знаем", Russian
"Adalama" ( A, da, la, ma...), devised for Fulani speakers in West Africa to memorise the Adlam script.
There are several recordings of the Cherokee syllabary with this melody.
A singable version for memorising the Déné/Carrier syllabics chart.

References 

Songs about language
Children's songs
Early childhood education
Song